Richard Yniguez (born December 8, 1946) is an American actor and director mainly  known for Boulevard Nights, What's Cooking? and The Deadly Tower.

Film

Television

References

 Demetria Fulton previewed Richard Yniguez in Barnaby Jones; episode titled, "Murder Go-Round" (04/15/1973).

External links
 

1946 births
Living people
American male actors of Mexican descent